Uda Talawinna Megodagammedda, also known as Maanthopu, is a village in Sri Lanka. It is located within Central Province. The majority of the population is Muslim.

Maanthopu is an area which is in Udathalawinna whose history goes back one thousand years. Eventually, the name changed to the current Maanthopu. According to legend, some men saw a deer; they chased it and captured a dog. The word maan means 'deer' and thopu means 'land'.

See also
List of towns in Central Province, Sri Lanka

External links

Populated places in Kandy District